Pyin-O-Lwin Bird Sanctuary is a protected area in Myanmar's Pyinoolwin Township in Mandalay Region covering an area of . It is one of four protected wetlands.

Description
This sanctuary is near the town of Pyin-O-Lwin. The road linking Anesakhan and Lashio towns passes through the sanctuary. It receives south-west monsoon rains of about  every year from June to August.

Biodiversity
Pyin-O-Lwin Bird Sanctuary harbours evergreen hill forest. Wildlife present include green peafowl (Pavo muticus), grey peacock pheasant (Polyplectron bicalcaratum) and barking deer (Muntiacus muntjak).

History
Pyin-O-Lwin Bird Sanctuary was gazetted in 1918.
It was established in 1927. As of 2017, it is managed by the Forest Department.

Tourism
Pyin-O-Lwin town is a favourite destination for the tourist since, it is located on the main road and railway line from Mandalay to Lashio. Many tourist attractions like National Kandawgyi Gardens, flower garden have resulted in need to develop Pyin-O-Lwin Bird sanctuary. Regular educated forest staff is in need to direct the local and foreign tourist visiting the sanctuary.

Threats

 Logging
 Fishing
 Hunting and trading of wildlife
 Shifting cultivation practices have led to encroachment
Extraction of water, fuel wood, charcoal and non-timber forest produce is depriving wildlife habitat

References

Protected areas of Myanmar
Protected areas established in 1918